Hugh Francis Carleton (3 July 1810 – 14 July 1890) was New Zealand's first member of parliament.

Early life
Carleton was born in 1810. He was the son of Francis Carleton (1780–1870) and Charlotte Margaretta Molyneux-Montgomerie (d. 1874). Hugh Carleton, 1st Viscount Carleton was the brother of his grandfather, John Carleton. His family was living in Clare, County Tipperary and then Greenfield, County Cork, Ireland. He was educated at Eton College and Trinity College, Cambridge.  He studied law in London, then art in Italy.

Career as a journalist in New Zealand
He settled in the Bay of Islands in 1842. On 30 November 1859, he married Lydia Jane Williams, youngest daughter of the missionary Henry Williams and Marianne Williams; they had no children.

He became a journalist in Auckland and edited the New Zealander then established the Anglo-Maori Warder, which followed an editorial policy in opposition to Governor George Grey. In 1856 he became the editor of the Southern Cross.

Career as a member of parliament

He was a member of New Zealand's first, second, third, and fourth Parliaments, representing the  electorate from 1853 to 1870, when he was defeated. Due to the system of staggering used in the first general election, Carleton was actually the first MP ever elected in New Zealand (though he was elected unopposed), hence he liked to be called the Father of the House.

Carleton was the second Chairman of Committees, succeeding Frederick Merriman on 17 April 1856, i.e. just after the opening of the first session of the 2nd Parliament. He remained Chairman of Committees until he left Parliament in 1870.

He had a strong interest in parliamentary procedure, and unsuccessfully lobbied for the position of Speaker.  He is known for his unsuccessful campaign against the availability of alcoholic beverages at Bellamy's, the parliamentary restaurant.  He was also a critic of the idea that all voting districts should contain the same number of voters, saying that this system gave "a preponderating control" of the political world to one specific class.  He was described as "scholarly" by his allies and "pedantic" by his critics.

England
Carleton returned to England and spent the last ten years of his life there. He died at Lewisham, Surrey, England, on 14 July 1890.

His wife Lydia died in Napier, New Zealand on 28 November 1891.

Publications
  (1874) - The life of Henry Williams, Archdeacon of Waimate. Auckland NZ.  Online available from Early New Zealand Books (ENZB).

Notes

References

1810 births
1890 deaths
Members of the New Zealand House of Representatives
Unsuccessful candidates in the 1871 New Zealand general election
New Zealand MPs for North Island electorates
People educated at Eton College
Alumni of Trinity College, Cambridge
Irish emigrants to New Zealand (before 1923)
New Zealand editors
New Zealand magazine editors
New Zealand journalists
19th-century New Zealand politicians